Loimaw (also known as Lwemaw) was a Shan state in the Myelat region of what is today Burma. Its capital was Minywa. Its population was mostly Pa-O.

References

Geography of Shan State